The Peace Corps is an independent agency and program of the United States government that trains and deploys volunteers to provide international development assistance. It was established in March 1961 by an executive order of President John F. Kennedy and authorized by Congress the following September by the Peace Corps Act.

Kennedy first publicly proposed the Peace Corps during his 1960 presidential campaign as a means to improve America's global image and leadership in the Cold War; he cited the Soviet Union's deployment of skilled citizens "abroad in the service of world communism" and argued the U.S. must do the same to advance values such as democracy and liberty. The Peace Corps was formally established within three months of Kennedy's presidency, garnering both bipartisan congressional support and popular support, particularly among recent university graduates.

The official goal of the Peace Corps is to assist developing countries by providing skilled workers in fields such as education, health, entrepreneurship, women's empowerment, and community development. Volunteers are American citizens, typically with a college degree, who are assigned to specific projects in certain countries based on their qualifications and experience; they often work with other stakeholders, governments, schools, non-profit organizations, non-governmental organizations, and entrepreneurs. Following three months of technical training, Peace Corps members are expected to serve at least two years in the host country, after which they may request an extension of service. Volunteers are strongly encouraged to respect local customs, learn the prevailing language, and live in comparable conditions. 

In addition to its technical mission, the Peace Corps is intended to promote mutual understanding between Americans and foreign peoples, and by extension improve the international standing of the U.S.

In its inaugural year, the Peace Corps had 900 volunteers serving 16 countries, reaching its peak in 1966 with 15,556 volunteers in 52 countries. Following budget cuts in 1989, the number of volunteers declined to 5,100, though subsequent increases in funding led to renewed growth into the 21st century; by its 50th anniversary in 2011, there were over 8,500 volunteers serving in 77 countries. Since its inception, more than 240,000 Americans have joined the Peace Corps and served in 142 countries.

History

1950–1959

In 1950, Walter Reuther, president of the United Auto Workers, proposed, in an article titled, "A Proposal for a Total Peace Offensive," that the United States establish a voluntary agency for young Americans to be sent around the world to fulfill humanitarian and development objectives. Subsequently, throughout the 1950s, Reuther gave speeches to the following effect:I have been saying for a long time that I believe the more young Americans who are trained to join with other young people in the world to be sent abroad with slide rule, textbook, and medical kit to help people help themselves with the tools of peace, the fewer young people will need to be sent with guns and weapons of war.In addition, following the end of World War II, various members of the United States Congress proposed bills to establish volunteer organizations in developing countries. In December 1951, Representative John F. Kennedy (D-Massachusetts) suggested to a group that "young college graduates would find a full life in bringing technical advice and assistance to the underprivileged and backward Middle East ... In that calling, these men would follow the constructive work done by the religious missionaries in these countries over the past 100 years." In 1952 Senator Brien McMahon (D-Connecticut) proposed an "army" of young Americans to act as "missionaries of democracy". Privately funded nonreligious organizations began sending volunteers overseas during the 1950s. While Kennedy is credited with the creation of the Peace Corps as president, the first initiative came from Senator Hubert H. Humphrey, Jr. (D-Minnesota), who introduced the first bill to create the Peace Corps in 1957—three years before Kennedy, as a presidential candidate, would raise the idea during a campaign speech at the University of Michigan. In his autobiography The Education of a Public Man, Humphrey wrote,

Only in 1959, however, did the idea receive serious attention in Washington when Congressman Henry S. Reuss of Wisconsin proposed a "Point Four Youth Corps". In 1960, he and Senator Richard L. Neuberger of Oregon introduced identical measures calling for a nongovernmental study of the idea's "advisability and practicability". Both the House Foreign Affairs Committee and the Senate Foreign Relations Committee endorsed the study, the latter writing the Reuss proposal into the pending Mutual Security legislation. In this form it became law in June 1960. In August the Mutual Security Appropriations Act was enacted, making available US$10,000 for the study, and in November ICA contracted with Maurice Albertson, Andrew E. Rice, and Pauline E. Birky of Colorado State University Research Foundation for the study.

1960–1969
In August 1960, following the 1960 Democratic National Convention, Walter Reuther visited John F. Kennedy at the Kennedy compound in Hyannisport to discuss Kennedy's platform and staffing of a future administration. It was there that Reuther got Kennedy to commit to creating the executive agency that would become the Peace Corps. Under Reuther's leadership, the United Auto Workers had earlier that summer put together a policy platform that included a "youth peace corps" to be sent to developing nations. Subsequently, at the urging of Reuther, John F. Kennedy announced the idea for such an organization on October 14, 1960, at a late-night campaign speech at the University of Michigan in Ann Arbor on the steps of the Michigan Union. He later dubbed the proposed organization the "Peace Corps." A brass marker commemorates the place where Kennedy stood. In the weeks after the 1960 election, the study group at Colorado State University released their feasibility a few days before Kennedy's Presidential Inauguration in January 1961.

Critics opposed the program. Kennedy's opponent, Richard M. Nixon, predicted it would become a "cult of escapism" and "a haven for draft dodgers."

Others doubted whether recent graduates had the necessary skills and maturity for such a task. The idea was popular among students, however, and Kennedy pursued it, asking respected academics such as Max Millikan and Chester Bowles to help him outline the organization and its goals. During his inaugural address, Kennedy again promised to create the program: "And so, my fellow Americans: ask not what your country can do for you—ask what you can do for your country". President Kennedy in a speech at the White House on June 22, 1962, "Remarks to Student Volunteers Participating in Operation Crossroads Africa", acknowledged that Operation Crossroads for Africa was the basis for the development of the Peace Corps. "This group and this effort really were the progenitors of the Peace Corps and what this organization has been doing for a number of years led to the establishment of what I consider to be the most encouraging indication of the desire for service not only in this country but all around the world that we have seen in recent years". The Peace Corps website answered the question "Who Inspired the Creation of the Peace Corps?", acknowledging that the Peace Corps were based on Operation Crossroads Africa founded by Rev. James H. Robinson.

On March 1, 1961, Kennedy signed Executive Order 10924 that officially started the Peace Corps. Concerned with the growing tide of revolutionary sentiment in the Third World, Kennedy saw the Peace Corps as a means of countering the stereotype of the "Ugly American" and "Yankee imperialism," especially in the emerging nations of post-colonial Africa and Asia. Kennedy appointed his brother-in-law, Sargent Shriver, to be the program's first director. Shriver fleshed out the organization and his think tank outlined the organization's goals and set the initial number of volunteers. The Peace Corps began recruiting in July 1962; Bob Hope recorded radio and television announcements hailing the program.

Until about 1967, applicants had to pass a placement test of "general aptitude" (knowledge of various skills needed for Peace Corps assignments) and language aptitude. After an address from Kennedy, who was introduced by Rev. Russell Fuller of Memorial Christian Church, Disciples of Christ, on August 28, 1961, the first group of volunteers left for Ghana and Tanzania, known as Tanganyika at the time. The program was formally authorized by Congress on September 22, 1961, and within two years over 7,300 volunteers were serving in 44 countries. This number increased to 15,000 in June 1966, the largest number in the organization's history.

The organization experienced controversy in its first year of operation. On October 13, 1961, a postcard from a volunteer named Margery Jane Michelmore in Nigeria to a friend in the U.S. described her situation in Nigeria as "squalor and absolutely primitive living conditions." However, this postcard never made it out of the country. The University of Ibadan College Students Union demanded deportation and accused the volunteers of being "America's international spies" and the project as "a scheme designed to foster neocolonialism." Soon the international press picked up the story, leading several people in the U.S. administration to question the program. Nigerian students protested the program, while the American volunteers sequestered themselves and eventually began a hunger strike. After several days, the Nigerian students agreed to open a dialogue with the Americans.

Policies

The theme of enabling Americans to volunteer in poor countries appealed to Kennedy because it fit in with his campaign themes of self-sacrifice and volunteerism, while also providing a way to redefine American relations with the Third World. Upon taking office, Kennedy issued an executive order establishing the Peace Corps. Shriver, not Kennedy, energetically lobbied Congress for approval. Kennedy proudly took the credit, and ensured that it remained free of CIA influence. He largely left its administration to Shriver. To avoid the appearance of favoritism to the Catholic Church, the Corps did not place its volunteers with any religious agencies. In the first twenty-five years, more than 100,000 Americans served in 44 countries as part of the program. Most volunteers taught English in local schools, but many became involved in activities like construction and food delivery. Shriver practiced affirmative action, and women comprised about 40 percent of the first 7000 volunteers. However given the paucity of black college graduates, racial minorities never reached five percent. The Corps developed its own training program, based on nine weeks at an American university, with a focus on conversational language, world affairs, and desired job skills. That was followed by three weeks at a Peace Corps camp in Puerto Rico, and week or two of orientation the home and the host country.

1970–1999
In July 1971, President Richard Nixon, an opponent of the program, brought the Peace Corps under the umbrella agency ACTION. President Jimmy Carter, an advocate of the program, said that his mother, who had served as a nurse in the program, had "one of the most glorious experiences of her life" in the Peace Corps. In 1979, he made it fully autonomous in an executive order. This independent status was further secured by 1981 legislation making the organization an independent federal agency.

In 1976, Deborah Gardner was found murdered in her home in Tonga, where she was serving in the Peace Corps. Dennis Priven, a fellow Peace Corps worker, was later charged with the murder by the Tonga government. He was found not guilty by reason of insanity, and was sentenced to serve time in a mental institution in Washington D.C. Priven was never admitted to any institution, and the handling of the case has been heavily criticized. The main criticism has been that the Peace Corps seemingly worked to keep one of its volunteers from being found guilty of murder, due to the reflection it would have on the organization.

2000–present
Although the earliest volunteers were typically thought of as generalists, the Peace Corps had requests for technical personnel from the start. For example, geologists were among the first volunteers requested by Ghana, an early volunteer host. An article in Geotimes (a trade publication) in 1963, reviewed the program, with a follow-up history of Peace Corps geoscientists appearing in that publication in 2004. During the Nixon Administration the Peace Corps included foresters, computer scientists, and small business advisers among its volunteers.

In 1982, President Ronald Reagan appointed director Loret Miller Ruppe, who initiated business-related programs. For the first time, a significant number of conservative and Republican volunteers joined the Corps, as the organization continued to reflect the evolving political and social conditions in the United States. Funding cuts during the early 1980s reduced the number of volunteers to 5,380, its lowest level since the early years. Funding increased in 1985, when Congress began raising the number of volunteers, reaching 10,000 in 1992.

After the 2001 September 11 attacks, which alerted the U.S. to growing anti-U.S. sentiment in the Middle East, President George W. Bush pledged to double the size of the organization within five years as a part of the War on Terrorism. For the 2004 fiscal year, Congress increased the budget to US$325 million, US$30 million above that of 2003 but US$30 million below the President's request.

As part of an economic stimulus package in 2008, President Barack Obama proposed to double the size of the Peace Corps. However, the amount requested was insufficient to reach this goal by 2011. In fact, the number of applicants to the Peace Corps declined steadily from a high of 15,384 in 2009 to 10,118 in 2013. Congress raised the 2010 appropriation from the US$373 million requested by the President to US$400 million, and proposed bills would raise this further for 2011 and 2012. According to former director Gaddi Vasquez, the Peace Corps is trying to recruit more diverse volunteers of different ages and make it look "more like America". A Harvard International Review article from 2007 proposed to expand the Peace Corps, revisit its mission, and equip it with new technology. In 1961 only 1% of volunteers were over 50, compared with 5% today. Ethnic minorities currently comprise 34% of volunteers, compared to around 35% of the U.S. population.

In 2009, Casey Frazee, who was sexually assaulted while serving in South Africa, created First Response Action, an advocacy group for a stronger Peace Corps response for volunteers who are survivors or victims of physical and sexual violence. In 2010, concerns about the safety of volunteers were illustrated by a report, compiled from official public documents, listing hundreds of violent crimes against volunteers since 1989. In 2011, a 20/20 investigation found that "more than 1,000 young American women have been raped or sexually assaulted in the last decade while serving as Peace Corps volunteers in foreign countries."

In a historic first, all Peace Corps volunteers worldwide were withdrawn from their host countries on March 15, 2020, due to the COVID-19 pandemic. Volunteers were not eligible for unemployment or health benefits, although some Members of Congress said they should be. Legislators also called upon FEMA to hire Peace Corps volunteers until the end of their service.

International presence

During its history, Peace Corps volunteers have worked in the following countries:

Latin America and the Caribbean (23% of volunteers serve here, 2019)

  (1992–1994)
  (since 1962)
  (1962–1971, 1990–2008)
  (1962–1981)
  (1961–1982, 1991–1998)
  (1961–1981, since 2010)
  (since 1963)
  (since 1961)
  (since 1962)
  (since 1962)
  (1962–1980, 1993–2016)
  (since 1961)
  (since 1963)
  (1966–1971, since 1995)
  (1982–1987, 1990–1991, 1996–2005)
  (1962–2012)
  (since 1962)
  (since 2004)
  (1968–1979, since 1991)
  (1963–1971, since 1990)
  (since 1966)
  (1962–1974, since 2002)
  (since 1961)
  (since 1961)
  (1995–2013)
  (1963–1973, 1991–1997)
  (1962–1976)

Europe and central Asia (13% of volunteers serve here, 2019)

  (1992–1997, since 2003)
  (since 1992)
  (2003–2016)
  (2000–2002)
  (1991–2013)
  (1962–1964)
  (1990–1997)
  (1992–2002)
  (since 2001)
  (1990–1997)
  (1993–2011)
  (1992–2002)
  (1992–2002)
  (since 2014)
  (since 1993)
  (since 1996)
  (1970–1975, 1990–1998)
  (since 1993)
  (1990–2001)
  (1991–2013)
  (1992–2003)
  (1990–2002)
  (1993–2013)
  (1962–1971)
  (1992–2005)
  (since 1992)

Middle East and north Africa (3% of volunteers serve here, 2019)

  (1974–1979)
  (1962–1976)
  (1997–2002, 2004–2015)
  (1966–1969)
  (since 1963)
  (1973–1983)
  (1962–1996, 2013)
  (1973–1994)

Subsaharan Africa (46% of volunteers serve here, 2019)

  (since 1968)
  (1966–1997, since 2003)
  (1967–1987, 1995–2017)
  (1983–1993)
  (1988–2013)
  (since 1962)
  (1966–1979, 1987–1998, 2003–2006)
  (1988–1995, since 2015)
  (1991–1997)
 (1962–1981, 1990–2003)
  (1972–1996)
  (1970–1991)
  (1988–1993)
  (1995–1998)
  (1969–1996, since 2003)
  (1962–1977, 1995–1999, since 2007)
  (1963–1968, 1973–2005)
  (since 1961)
  (1963–1966, 1969–1971, since 1985)
  (1988–1998)
  (1964–2014, since 2020)
  (since 1967)
  (1962–1990, since 2008)
  (since 1993)
  (1963–1976, since 1978)
  (1971–2012, 2014–2015)
  (1969–1976)
  (1966–1967, 1971–2011)
  (since 1998)
  (since 1990)
  (1962–2011)
  (1961–1976, 1992–1995)
  (1975–1993, since 2008)
  (1990–1996)
  (since 1963)
  (1974–1995)
  (1962–1994, 2010–2013, since 2016)
  (1962–1970)
  (since 1997)
  (1984–1986)
  (1961–1969, since 1979)
 (since 1967)
  (since 1962)
  (1964–1972, 1991–1999, since 2001)
  (since 1994)
  (1991–2001)

Asia (11% of volunteers serve here, 2019)

  (1962–1979)
  (1998–2006)
  (since 2007)
  (Under the name "U.S.-China friendship volunteers")(1993-2020)
  (1961–1976)
  (1963–1965, since 2010)
  (1962–1983)
  (since 1991)
  (since 2016)
  (1962–2004, since 2012)
  (1961–1967, 1988–1991)
  (1961–1990, since 1992)
  (1966–1981)
  (1962–1964, 1967–1970, 1983–1998, since 2018)
  (since 1962)
  (2002–2006, since 2015)

Oceania (5% of volunteers serve here, 2019)
  (1968–1998, since 2003)
  (1982–1995)
  (1966–1996)
  (1971–2000, since 2020)
  (1974–2008)
  (1966–2018)
  (1994–2002)
  (1981–2001)
  (since 1967)
  (since 1967)
  (1977–1997)
  (since 1990)

Peace Corps activities were suspended and all volunteers worldwide were evacuated on March 15, 2020, due to the COVID-19 pandemic.

Application and volunteer process

The application for the Peace Corps takes up to one hour, unless one talks to a recruiter. The applicant must be at least 18 years old and a U.S. citizen and, according to a 2018 document, they should apply 6 to 9 months before they want to leave. They must go through an interview.

Applicants can apply to only one placement every year. Placements can be sorted through the Peace Corps six project sectors: Agriculture, Environment, Community Economic Development, Health, Education, and Youth in Development. Applicants may also narrow down their application of choice by country they want to serve in various regions of the world.

Peace Corps volunteers are expected to serve for 2 years in the foreign country, with 3 months of training before swearing in to service. This occurs in country with host country national trainers in language and assignment skills.

Prior to 2014, the application process took about a year.

Initiatives
The Peace Corps aims to educate community members on the different illnesses that are present in developing countries as well as what treatments exist in order prevent these illnesses from spreading. Volunteers are also often there in order to teach community members about modern agricultural techniques in order for them to more effectively produce food for themselves and each other (Peace Corps). The Corps is also a proponent of equal education and moves to allow for equal education opportunities for girls in countries like Liberia and Ethiopia. In 2015, the organization partnered with United States Agency for International Development (USAID) to implement First Lady Michelle Obama's Let Girls Learn initiative.

Eradicating malaria in Africa
The Corps launched its initiative to engage volunteers in malaria control efforts in 2011. The initiative, which grew out of malaria prevention programs in Peace Corps Senegal, now includes volunteers in 24 African countries.

Environment
The Corps offers a variety of environmental programs. Needs assessments determine which programs apply to each country. Programs include effective and efficient forms of farming, recycling, park management, environmental education, and developing alternative fuel sources. Volunteers must have some combination of academic degrees and practical experience.

The three major programs are Protected-Areas Management, Environment Education or Awareness, and Forestry.

In Protected areas management, volunteers work with parks or other programs to teach resource conservation. Volunteer activities include technical training, working with park staff on wildlife preservation, organizing community-based conservation programs for sustainable use of forests or marine resources, and creating activities for raising revenue to protect the environment.

Environment Education or Awareness focuses on communities that have environmental issues regarding farming and income. Programs include teaching in elementary and secondary schools; environmental education to youth programs; creation of environmental groups; support forest and marine resource sustainability; ways of generating money; urban sanitation management; and educating farmers about soil conservation, forestry, and vegetable gardening.

Forestry programs help communities conserve natural resources through projects such as soil conservation, flood control, creation of sustainable fuels, agroforestry (e.g., fruit and vegetable production), alley cropping, and protection of biodiversity.

Peace Corps Response
Peace Corps Response, formerly named the Crisis Corps, was created by Peace Corps Director Mark Gearan in 1996. Gearan modeled the Crisis Corps after the National Peace Corps Association's successful Emergency Response Network (ERN) of Returned Peace Corps Volunteers willing to respond to crises when needed. ERN emerged in response to the 1994 Rwandan genocide. On November 19, 2007 Peace Corps Director Ronald Tschetter changed Crisis Corps's name to Peace Corps Response.

The change to Peace Corps Response allowed Peace Corps to include projects that did not rise to the level of a crisis. The program deploys former volunteers on high-impact assignments that typically range from three to twelve months in duration.

Peace Corps Response volunteers generally receive the same allowances and benefits as their Peace Corps counterparts, including round-trip transportation, living and readjustment allowances, and medical care. Minimum qualifications include completion of at least one year of Peace Corps service, including training, in addition to medical and legal clearances. The Crisis Corps title was retained as a unique branch within Peace Corps Response, designed for volunteers who are deployed to true "crisis" situations, such as disaster relief following hurricanes, earthquakes, floods, volcanic eruptions and other catastrophes.

Education and languages
Peace Corps has created resources for teachers in the US and abroad to teach 101 languages. Resources vary by language, and include text, recordings, lesson plans and teaching notes.

Laws governing the Peace Corps

Executive orders
Peace Corps was originally established by Executive Order, and has been modified by several subsequent executive orders including:

 1961 – Executive Order 10924 – Establishment and administration of the Peace Corps in the Department of State (Kennedy)
 1962 – Executive Order 11041 – Continuance and administration of the Peace Corps in the Department of State (Kennedy)
 1963 – Executive Order 11103 – Providing for the appointment of former Peace Corps volunteers to the civilian career services (Kennedy)
 1971 – Executive Order 11603 – Assigning additional functions to the Director of ACTION (Nixon)
 1979 – Executive Order 12137 – The Peace Corps (Carter)

Laws
Federal laws governing the Peace Corps are contained in Title 22 of the United States Code – Foreign Relations and Intercourse, Chapter 34 – The Peace Corps.

Public laws are passed by Congress and the President and create or modify the U.S. Code. The first public law establishing Peace Corps in the US Code was The Peace Corps Act passed by the 87th Congress and signed into law on September 22, 1961. Several public laws have modified the Peace Corps Act, including:
  – The Peace Corps Act
 
 
 
 
 
 
  – Bill to carry into effect certain provisions of the Patent Cooperation Treaty, and for other purposes.
  – Peace Corps Act Amendments
  – The Foreign Service Act of 1980
  – International Security and Development Cooperation Act of 1981
  – International Security and Development Cooperation Act of 1985
  – Tax Reform Act of 1986
  – A bill to amend the Peace Corps Act to authorize appropriations for the Peace Corps for FY1993 and to establish Peace Corps foreign exchange fluctuations account, and for other purposes.
  – The Assisted Suicide Funding Restriction Act of 1997
  – Peace Corps Act, FY2002, 2003 Authorization Bill

Code of Federal Regulations
The Peace Corps is subject to Federal Regulations as prescribed by public law and executive order and contained in Title 22 of the Code of Federal Regulations under Chapter 3.

Limitations on former volunteers
Former members of the Peace Corps may not be assigned to military intelligence duties for a period of 4 years following Peace Corps service. Furthermore, they are forever prohibited from serving in a military intelligence posting to any country in which they volunteered. Former members may not apply for employment with the Central Intelligence Agency for a period of 5 years following Peace Corps Service.

Time limits on employment
Peace Corps employees receive time-limited appointments, and most employees are limited to a maximum of five years of employment. This time limit was established to ensure that Peace Corps' staff remain fresh and innovative. A related rule specifies that former employees cannot be re-employed until after the same amount of time that they were employed. Volunteer service is not counted for the purposes of either rule.

Union representation

Non-supervisory domestic employees are represented by the American Federation of State, County, and Municipal Employees (AFSCME) Local 3548. The Federal Labor Relations Agency certified the Union on May 11, 1983. About 500 domestic employees are members. The current collective bargaining agreement became effective on April 21, 1995.

Leadership

Directors
On January 3, 2018, President Donald Trump nominated Josephine "Jody" Olsen as the 20th director of the Peace Corps. Olsen has a long history with the agency, serving as Acting Director in 2009, Deputy Director from 2002 to 2009, Chief of Staff from 1989 to 1992, Regional Director, North Africa Near East, Asia, Pacific from 1981 to 1984, and Country Director in Togo from 1979 to 1981. Olsen also served as a Peace Corps volunteer in Tunisia from 1966 to 1968. She left office on January 20, 2021. 

In April 2022, President Biden nominated Carol Spahn as director to succeed Olsen, and she was confirmed by the United States Senate on December 13, 2022. Spahn was acting director from January 20, 2021, until November 16, 2021, and CEO from November 2021 to November 2022. She had previously served as a Peace Corps volunteer in Romania and subsequently returned as Country Director in Malawi, then Chief of Operations for Eastern and Southern Africa, following a career in the NGO and private sectors.

The full list of directors is as follows:

Inspector General
The Peace Corps Office of Inspector General is authorized by law to review all programs and operations of the Peace Corps. The OIG is an independent entity within the Peace Corps. The inspector general (IG) reports directly to the Peace Corps Director. In addition, the IG reports to Congress semiannually with data on OIG activities. The OIG serves as the law enforcement arm of the Peace Corps and works closely with the Department of State, the Department of Justice, and other federal agencies OIG has three sections to conduct its functions:Audit – Auditors review functional activities of the Peace Corps, such as contract compliance and financial and program operations, to ensure accountability and to recommend improved levels of economy and efficiency;

     Evaluations – Evaluators analyze the management and program operations of the Peace Corps at both overseas posts and domestic offices. They identify best practices and recommend program improvements and ways to accomplish Peace Corps' mission and strategic goals.

     Investigations – Investigators respond to allegations of criminal or administrative wrongdoing by Peace Corps Volunteers, Peace Corps personnel, including experts and consultants, and by those who do business with the Peace Corps, including contractors.From 2006 to 2007, H. David Kotz was the Inspector General.

Criticism
Critics and criticisms of Peace Corps include former volunteer and country director Robert L. Strauss in Foreign Policy, The New York Times, The American Interest  and elsewhere, an article by a former volunteer describing assaults on volunteers from 1992 to 2010, an ABC news report on 20/20, a Huffington Post article on former Peace Corps volunteers speaking out on rapes, and About.com's article on rape and assault in the Peace Corps.

In the Reagan Administration, in 1986, an article in the Multinational Monitor looked critically at the Peace Corps. On a positive note, the writer praises the Corps for aspects saying that it is "not in the business of transferring massive economic resources. Rather it concentrates on increasing productivity and encouraging self-reliance in villages that are often ignored by large-scale development agencies," and notes the "heavy emphasis on basic education" by the Corps. "Many returned volunteers complain that the Peace Corps does little to promote or make use of their rich experiences once they return ... [A] Peace Corps volunteer is sent in ... [to] relieve ... the local government from having to develop policies that assure equitable distribution of health care ... During the early years there were many failures in structure and programming ... Some critics charge that the Peace Corps is only a somewhat ineffective attempt to counter damage done to the U.S. image abroad by its aggressive military and its unscrupulous businesses ... Many observers and some returned volunteers charge that, in addition to public relations for the United States, Peace Corps programs serve to legitimize dictators ... When he began evaluating the Corps in the 1960s, Charlie Peters found "they were training volunteers to be junior diplomats. Giving them a course in American studies, world affairs and communism ... Although it seems unlikely that the Peace Corps is used in covert operations, wittingly or not it is often used in conjunction with U.S. military interests ... In a review of the Peace Corps in March the House Select Committee on Hunger praised the agency for effective work in the areas of agriculture and conservation, while recommending that the Corps expand its African Food Systems Initiative, increase the number of volunteers in the field, recruit more women, and move to depoliticize country dictatorships."

The author suggests that "the poor should be encouraged to organize a power base to gain more leverage with the powers-that-be" by the Peace Corps and that "The Peace Corps is the epitome of Kennedy's Camelot mythology. It is a tall order to expect a small program appended to an immense superpower, to make a difference, but it is a goal worth striving for."

In December 2003, a report by the Brookings Institution praised the Peace Corps but proposed changes. These include relabeling Peace Corps volunteers in certain countries, greater host country ownership, reverse volunteers (have volunteers from the host country in the U.S.), and multilateral volunteers. The Brookings Institution wrote that a "one-year service commitment [for the Baby Boom generation] could make the Peace Corps more attractive to older Americans, possibly combined with the option of returning to the same site or country after a three-month break" and customized placement to a specific country would increase the number of people volunteering.

In a critique by The Future of Freedom Foundation, James Bovard mixes history of the Peace Corps with current interpretations. He writes that in the 1980s, "The Peace Corps's world-saving pretensions were a joke on American taxpayers and Third World folks who expected real help." He goes on to criticize the difference in rhetoric and action of Peace Corps volunteers, even attacking its establishment as "the epitome of emotionalism in American politics." Using snippets of reports, accounts of those in countries affected by the Peace Corps and even concluded that at one point "some Peace Corps agricultural efforts directly hurt Third World poor." At the end of the article, Bovard noted that all Peace Corps volunteers he had talked with conceded they have not helped foreigners ... but he acknowledges that "Some Peace Corps volunteers, like some Americans who volunteer for religion missions abroad, have truly helped foreigners."

Sexual assault

The Peace Corps has been criticized for failing to properly respond to the sexual violence that many of its female volunteers face. BoingBoing editor Xeni Jardin describes criticism of the agency's response to assault: "A growing number of ex-Peace Corps volunteers are speaking out about having survived rape and other forms of sexual assault while assigned overseas. They say the agency ignored their concerns for safety or requests for relocation, and tried to blame rape victims for their attacks. Their stories, and support from families and advocates, are drawing attention from lawmakers and promises of reform from the agency". Among 8,655 volunteers there are on average 22 Peace Corps women who reported being the victims of rape or attempted rape each year.

At a meeting of the House Foreign Affairs Committee in 2011, Peace Corps volunteers shared their experiences of violence and sexual assault. At this meeting, it was found that between 2000 and 2009 there have been several cases of rape or attempted rape, and about 22 women are sexually assaulted each year. The case of murdered Peace Corps volunteer Kate Puzey was discussed. The Peace Corps has gained attention in the media and their directors have been attacked for how they handled this situation. Kate Puzey's mother was one of those to make a comment at the meeting about how badly the situation with her daughter had been handled. One woman claimed that her country's director had blamed her for getting raped, while other victims have also been similarly blamed. Criticism of how Peace Corps has responded to sexual assaults against volunteers culminated in the appointment of Kellie Green as the agency's first Director of the Office Of Victims Advocacy in 2011. Green was eventually pushed out of her position in April 2015 for purportedly "creating a hostile work environment". Greene maintains that Peace Corps retaliated against her for pressing agency officials to fully comply with their responsibilities towards volunteers who have been victims of sexual assault. A Change.org petition demanding that Green be reinstated began circulating among former volunteers in December 2015.

In 2009, the most recent year reported, 69% of Peace Corps crime victims were women, 88% were under 30, and 82% were Caucasian. Worldwide, there were 15 cases of rape/attempted rape and 96 cases of sexual assault reported for a total of 111 sexual crimes committed against female Peace Corps volunteers. The majority of women who join the Peace Corps are in their mid-twenties. In 62% of the more than 2,900 assault cases since 1990, the victim was identified as being alone. In 59% of assault cases, the victim was identified as a woman in her 20s.

In popular culture
Frank Zappa and The Mothers of Invention have a song named "Who Needs the Peace Corps?" on their 1968 album We're Only in It for the Money.

In popular culture, the Peace Corps has been used as a comedic plot device in such movies as Airplane!, Christmas with the Kranks, Shallow Hal, and Volunteers or used to set the scene for a historic era, as when Frances "Baby" Houseman tells the audience she plans to join the Peace Corps in the introduction to the movie Dirty Dancing.

The Peace Corps has also been documented on film and examined more seriously and in more depth. The 2006 documentary film Death of Two Sons, directed by Micah Schaffer, juxtaposes the deaths of Amadou Diallo, a Guinean-American who was gunned down by four New York City policemen with 41 bullets, and Peace Corps volunteer Jesse Thyne who lived with Amadou's family in Guinea and died in a car crash there. Jimi Sir, released in 2007, is a documentary portrait of volunteer James Parks' experiences as a high school science, math and English teacher during the last 10 weeks of his service in Nepal. James speaks Nepali fluently and shows a culture where there are no roads, vehicles, electricity, plumbing, telephone or radio. The movie El Rey, directed and written by Antonio Dorado in 2004, attacks corrupt police, unscrupulous politicians and half-hearted revolutionaries but also depicts the urban legend of Peace Corps Volunteers "training" native Colombians how to process coca leaves into cocaine.

In the 1969 film, Yawar Mallku/Sangre de cóndor/Blood of the Condor, Bolivian director Jorge Sanjinés portrayed Peace Corps volunteers in the camp as arrogant, ethnocentric, and narrow-minded imperialists out to destroy Indian culture. One particularly powerful scene showed Indians attacking a clinic while the volunteers inside sterilized Indian women against their will. The film is thought to be at least partially responsible for the expulsion of the Peace Corps from Bolivia in 1971. Peace Corps volunteer Fred Krieger who was serving in Bolivia at the time said, "It was an effective movie – emotionally very arousing – and it directly targeted Peace Corps volunteers. I thought I would be lynched before getting out of the theatre. To my amazement, people around me smiled courteously as we left, no one commented, it was just like any other movie."

In 2016, Peace Corps partnered with jewelry retailer Alex and Ani to create cord bracelets to raise money for the Peace Corps' Let Girls Learn Fund.

Fictional Peace Corps volunteers

 Frances "Baby" Houseman in the 1987 film Dirty Dancing plans to join the Peace Corps after graduating from Mount Holyoke.
 In The Waltons Elizabeth Walton joins the Peace Corps in the TV Movie series 
 In Boy Meets World, Jack and Rachel graduate from the fictional Pennbrook University and join the Peace Corps.

See also

 Documentary A Towering Task: The Story of the Peace Corps
 List of notable Peace Corps volunteers
 AmeriCorps
 Language education
 List of language self-study programs
 Peace Corps Memorial
 Provincial Reconstruction Team
 United States Cultural Exchange Programs
 British Romanian Educational Exchange
 CUSO
 Doctors Without Borders
 EU Aid Volunteers
 European Voluntary Service
 Fredskorpset
 International Voluntary Services
 JICA (Japan International Cooperation Agency)
 Korea International Cooperation Agency
 United Nations Volunteers
 Voluntary Service Overseas
 World Vision

Notes

References

Further reading
 Bernstein, Irving. (1991) Promises Kept: John F. Kennedy's New Frontier pp 259–79.
 Latham, Michael E. Modernization as ideology: American social science and" nation building" in the Kennedy era. (U of North Carolina Press, 2000). Online
 May, Gary. "Passing the Torch and Lighting Fires: The Peace Corps," in Thomas G. Paterson, ed. Kennedy's Quest for Victory: American Foreign Policy, 1961–1963 (1989) pp 284–316.

 The Annals of the American Academy of Political and Social Science Vol. 365, May, 1966; online at JSTOR Contents:
 Foreword . . . . . . . . . . .. . . . . . . . . J. Norman Parmer ix
 The Peace Corps In Our Past . . . . . . . . . . Charles J. Wetzel 1
 A Discovery Of Commitment ............... Joseph G. Colman 12
 Selection Of Volunteers .................. Edwin R. Henry 21
 The Preparation Of Peace Corps Volunteers For Overseas Service Donald R. Shea 29
 The Beginnings Of Peace Corps Programming ........ George E. Carter 46
 Volunteers In The Field: Great Expectations ......... Neil A. Boyer 55
 The Peace Corps Volunteer In The Field: Community Development ... Kirby Jones 63
 Volunteers In The Field: Teaching ............ . Arnold Deutchman 72
 The Overseas Staff .................... Lewis H. Butler 83
 The Peace Corps And The Private Sector: The Failure Of A Partnership Thomas D. Scott 93
 The Returning Volunteer ................ Robert Calvert, Jr. 105
 Evaluation And The Question Of Change .......... Meridan Bennett 119
 The Future Of The Peace Corps ............... Harris Wofford 
 Oral Communication Approved Peer Reviewed.........Saul Morgan Del Bagno

External links
 Czernek, Andrew (2012). Summary of studies done of returned Peace Corps volunteers (RPCVs)
 Tarnoff, Curt (April 26, 2018). The Peace Corps: Current Issues. Congressional Research Service
 In March 2011, the VOA Special English service of the Voice of America broadcast a 15-minute program on the Peace Corps and its 50th anniversary. A transcript and MP3 of the program, intended for English learners, can be found at "Peace Corps at 50: Same Mission of Aid, Just Smaller".
 
 Records of the Peace Corps in the National Archives (Record Group 490)

 
Appropriate technology organizations
Government agencies established in 1961
International volunteer organizations
Presidency of John F. Kennedy
Foreign relations agencies of the United States
Ramon Magsaysay Award winners
Recipients of the Order of Honour (Moldova)
1961 establishments in the United States